Zophobas morio is a species of darkling beetle, whose larvae are known by the common name superworm, kingworm, morio worm or simply Zophobas. Superworms are common in the reptile pet industry as food, along with giant mealworms, which are Tenebrio molitor larvae sprayed with juvenile hormone.

The larvae resemble very large mealworms, about 50 to 60 mm (1.7–2.25 in) long when full size, but unlike mealworms, the ends of their bodies are very dark, almost resembling a black color. Once they reach adult size, the larvae pupate, and later emerge as large, light coloured beetles, which in time darken to black. The larvae will not pupate if kept in a container with many other larvae and plentiful food, where they receive constant bodily contact. Keeping superworms this way is commonly used to hinder pupation. To mature the superworms, they must be kept alone for about 7–10 days. They will then, upon maturation, emerge from their pupal stage as darkling beetles.

Superworms are accepted by lizards, turtles, frogs, salamanders, birds, koi and other insectivorous animals. Their nutritional values are similar to those of mealworms, so it is possible that supplementation with calcium is necessary if they are used as a staple food item. In some cases they are preferred over mealworms due to their softer exoskeleton, making them more digestible to some reptiles. The larvae are odor-free (but the beetles possess a pungent chemical defense that may be released when provoked), and can be easily contained, making them ideal for raising at home to feed a collection of captive insectivores. The nutritional profile of the larvae is "46.80% proteins, 43.64% lipids, 8.17% ashes and 1.39% carbohydrates."

Relationship with humans

As pet feed
As with the popular mealworm, Zophobas morio larvae (commonly known as superworms) are widely used in pet care, more specifically as feed.

Superworms are relatively high in protein and fat, which make them attractive pet feed for captive reptiles, amphibians, fish, and birds. Their ability to stay alive without eating for 1–2 weeks makes the keeping process highly feasible for bulk commercial availability around the world. However, pet owners are advised to keep them in warm temperatures as, unlike the mealworm, superworms do not enter the process of hibernation. They are also known to bite when threatened by handling, although the bite is not very painful.

As waste disposal agents
In 2016, it was discovered by a group of high school students in Ateneo de Manila University that Zophobas morio larvae may be used in waste disposal as the larvae were found to consume expanded polystyrene foam. The research study compared the larger Zophobas morio larvae to the Tenebrio molitor larvae, which were previously used in a Stanford study tackling polystyrene degradation. The former study found that in equal bulk-weight categories, the Zophobas morio larvae may consume greater amounts of polystyrene for longer periods of time.

Distribution
This beetle occurs naturally in tropical regions of Central and South America, but has spread across the world for use as food for reptiles and other insectivorous pets.

See also
Entomophagy

Gallery

References

Further reading

Tenebrionidae
Beetles described in 1776
Pet foods
Insects as feed
Organisms breaking down plastic